These are the rosters of all participating teams at the women's water polo tournament at the 2013 World Aquatics Championships in Piscines Bernat Picornell, Barcelona, Spain from 21 July–2 August.

Group A

Ilse van der Meijden
Yasemin Smit
Marloes Nijhuis
Biurakn Hakhverdian
Sabrina van der Sloot
Nomi Stomphorst
Iefke van Belkum
Vivian Sevenich
Carolina Slagter
Dagmar Genee
Lieke Klaassen
Leonie van der Molen
Anne Heinis

Anna Ustyukhina
Diana Antonova
Ekaterina Prokofyeva
Elvina Karimova
Alexandra Antonova
Olga Belova
Ekaterina Tankeeva
Anna Grineva
Anna Timofeeva
Olga Beliaeva
Evgeniya Ivanova
Ekaterina Zelentsova
Anna Karnaukh

Marta Bach
Andrea Blas
Anna Espar
Laura Ester
Maica García Godoy
Patricia Herrera
Laura López
Ona Meseguer
Lorena Miranda
Matilde Ortiz
Jennifer Pareja
Pilar Peña Carrasco
Roser Tarragó

Elena Dukhanova
Diana Dadabaeva
Aleksandra Sarancha
Angelina Djumalieva
Evgeniya Ivanova
Ekaterina Morozova
Natalya Plyusova
Anna Shcheglova
Ramilya Halikova
Adelina Zinurova
Guzelya Hamitova
Anna Plyusova
Natalya Shlyonskaya

Group B

Lea Barta
Jayde Appel
Hannah Buckling
Holly Lincoln-Smith
Isobel Bishop
Bronwen Knox
Rowena Webster
Glencora Ralph
Zoe Arancini
Ashleigh Southern
Keesja Gofers
Nicola Zagame
Kelsey Wakefield

Yang Jun
Teng Fei
Liu Ping
Sun Yujun
He Jin
Sun Yating
Song Donglun
Xu Lu
Mei Xiaohan
Ma Huanhuan
Zhang Cong
Xia Qun
Wang Ying

Brooke Millar
Emily Cox
Kelly Mason
Nicole Lewis
Alexandra Boyd
Lynlee Smith
Sarah Landry
Danielle Lewis
Lauren Sieprath
Casie Bowry
Kirsten Hudson
Alexandra Myles
Ianeta Hutchinson

Anke Jacobs
Kimberly Schmidt
Kieran Paley
Christy Rawstron
Megan Schooling
Tarryn Schooling
Kimberly Kay
Lee-Anne Keet
Delaine Christian
Marcelle Keet
Lindsay Killeen
Kelsey White
Thembelihle Mkize

Group C

Krystina Alogbo
Sophie Baron La Salle
Joelle Bekhazi
Nicola Colterjohn
Carmen Eggens
Monika Eggens
Katrina Monton
Dominique Perreault
Marina Radu
Michele Relton
Christine Robinson
Stephanie Valin
Emma Wright

Eleni Kouvdou
Christina Tsoukala
Vasiliki Diamantopoulou
Ilektra Psouni
Margarita Plevritou
Alkisti Avramidou
Alexandra Asimaki
Antigoni Roumpesi
Christina Kotsia
Triantafyllia Manolioudaki
Eleftheria Plevritou
Alkistis Benekou
Chrysoula Diamantopoulou

Team roster

Rosemary Morris
Chloe Wilcox
Fiona McCann
Ciara Gibson-Byrne
Aine Hoy
Claire Nixon
Lisa Gibson
Hazel Musgrove
Peggy Etiebet
Angela Winstanley-Smith
Francesca Clayton
Kathryn Fowler
Jade Smith

Elizabeth Armstrong
Lauren Silver
Melissa Seidemann
Rachel Fattal
Caroline Clark
Maggie Steffens
Courtney Mathewson
Kiley Neushul
Jillian Kraus
Kelly Rulon
Annika Dries
Kami Craig
Tumua Anae

Group D

Manuela Canetti
Diana Abla
Marina Zablith
Marina Canetti
Luciane Maia
Adhara Santoro
Melani Dias
Izabela Chiappini
Victoria Muratore
Flávia Vigna
Mirella Coutinho
Viviane Bahia
Victoria Chamorro

Flóra Bolonyai
Orsolya Kasó
Dóra Antal
Barbara Bujka
Krisztina Garda
Anna Illés
Rita Keszthelyi
Dóra Kisteleki
Katalin Menczinger
Ibolya Kitti Miskolczi
Gabriella Szűcs
Orsolya Takács
Ildikó Tóth
Coach: András Merész

Elena Gigli
Francesca Pomeri
Arianna Garibotti
Federica Radicchi
Elisa Queirolo
Rosaria Aiello
Tania Di Mario
Roberta Bianconi
Giulia Enrica Emmolo
Valeria Palmieri
Aleksandra Cotti
Teresa Frassinetti
Loredana Sparano

Alexandra Zharkova
Natalya Shepelina
Aizhan Akilbayeva
Anna Turova
Anastassiya Mirshina
Anna Zubkova
Natalya Alexandrova
Yekaterina Glushkova
Assel Jakayeva
Marina Gritsenko
Alexandra Rozhentseva
Assem Mussarova
Kristina Krassikova

See also
Water polo at the 2013 World Aquatics Championships – Men's team rosters

References

External links
Official website
Records and statistics (reports by Omega)

World Aquatics Championships water polo squads
Women's team rosters
2013 in women's water polo